Giulia della Rena (1319 – 9 January 1367) was an Italian Roman Catholic professed member of the Order of Saint Augustine in its third order branch. Della Rena was orphaned sometime in her late childhood and sought work as a maid in Florence where she soon became a member of the Augustinian tertiaries. The religious then returned to Certaldo due to the negative Florentine economic and political climate where she became best known for rescuing a child from a burning building.

Life
Giulia della Rena was born to impoverished nobles (whose status began to wane) in Certaldo sometime in 1319. She was orphaned of both her parents sometime in her childhood.

Della Rena sought work outside of her hometown and became a maid to the Timolfi household in Florence. It was there that she became a professed member of the Order of Saint Augustine in its third order branch in 1338 at their church of the Holy Spirit while also receiving the habit. But the tumult in Florence caused her to return home to Certaldo where she rescued a child from a burning building in a move that brought her unwanted fame and attention. She then retired to live the remainder of her life as an anchoress in a small cell that was built to the church of Santi Jacopo e Filippo. She had little in her small cell save for a little window and a Crucifix.

Della Rena died at the beginning of 1367. Her remains were interred in the church of Santi Jacopo e Filippo and were moved to its altar in 1372.

Beatification

The 1819 confirmation of her local "cultus" (or popular devotion)which began almost right after she diedallowed for Pope Pius VII to approve her beatification.

References

External links
Saints SQPN

1319 births
1367 deaths
People from Certaldo
14th-century venerated Christians
14th-century Italian Roman Catholic religious sisters and nuns
Augustinian friars
Italian beatified people
Venerated Catholics
Beatifications by Pope Pius VII